Sinop is a genus of grasshoppers, belonging to the tribe Copiocerini.

The single species Sinop gracilifemur Descamps, 1984 is from Brazil.

References

Acrididae
Acrididae genera
Monotypic Orthoptera genera